WKSW (98.5 FM, "98.5 Kiss FM") is a Top 40 music formatted radio station broadcasting from Cookeville, Tennessee.  The station is owned by Zimmer Broadcasting, LLC.

History
On February 14, 2013, the then-WGIC rebranded from "Magic 98.5" to "98.5 Kiss FM". On February 21, 2013, WGIC changed their call letters to WKSW, to go with the "Kiss FM" branding.

On-Air Staff
Freaky Dave (Freak Show In The Morning) 
Rae Rae (Middays With Rae Rae) 
Scooter (Afternoons With The Scoot) 
Abbey (Nights) 
Jeff MCartne (Weekends With Jeff MCartne)

References

External links

KSW
Contemporary hit radio stations in the United States
Radio stations established in 1964